Paris Concert may refer to:
Paris Concert (Gerry Mulligan album) recorded 1954 and released 1955
Paris Concert (Circle album), 1971
Paris Concert (Keith Jarrett album) recorded 1988 and released 1990